Grindstone (January 23, 1993 – March 22, 2022) was a Thoroughbred racehorse, best known for winning the 1996 Kentucky Derby.

Background
Bred and owned by William T. Young's Overbrook Farm, Grindstone was the son of Unbridled out of the mare Buzz My Bell. Buzz My Bell's dam was a half-sister to La Grue, the dam of the Belmont Stakes winner Pass Catcher.

Upon the death of Go for Gin on March 8, 2022, Grindstone became the oldest living winner of the Kentucky Derby as well as any of the Triple Crown of Thoroughbred Racing races.

Racing career
As a three-year-old, Grindstone won the Louisiana Derby and was second in the Arkansas Derby. He then won the 1996 Kentucky Derby with a time of 2:01.06, edging Cavonnier at the wire by a nose. He was jockey Jerry Bailey's second Kentucky Derby winner, and the second in a row for trainer D. Wayne Lukas.

Grindstone was retired five days after his Kentucky Derby victory, when a bone chip was discovered in his knee. He was the first horse since Bubbling Over in 1926 to be retired immediately following a win in the Kentucky Derby.

Race Record

Stud record

Grindstone stood at Oakhurst Farm in Oregon, making him the first Kentucky Derby winner to ever stand in the Northwest. His progeny include two millionaires, GR I winner Birdstone and Ekolu Place. He is also, via Birdstone, the grandsire of Mine That Bird and Summer Bird, who both won Triple Crown races in 2009.

Pedigree

References

External links
 1996 Kentucky Derby video via YouTube

1993 racehorse births
2022 racehorse deaths
Racehorses trained in the United States
Racehorses bred in Kentucky
Kentucky Derby winners
Thoroughbred family 1-c